= Francis Pearson (American politician) =

American lawmaker

Francis Pearson was an American lawmaker who served in the Washington House of Representatives for the 1937 session and 1939 session but was not elected to the 1941 session. Re-elected for the 1943 session he served until September 18, 1947. He resigned to take up a seat on the Washington State Senate, which was vacated by the resignation of Donald H. Black on September 9, 1947.

Pearson served in the Washington State Senate from 1947 to 1957, then later was appointed chairman of the State Public Service Commission.
